Frederick William Pitcher (born 5 February 1967) is a Nauruan political figure. In December 2007, Pitcher was appointed Minister of Finance of Nauru, to serve in the Administration of President Marcus Stephen.

Pitcher became the President of Nauru on 10 November 2011, following the resignation of his predecessor, former President Marcus Stephen. He lost a parliamentary vote of confidence and lost the presidency on 15 November 2011 after only 6 days in power.

Background and earlier career

Educated in Australia, where Pitcher also has many family connections, he was viewed as a young reformist during the preceding Administration of President Ludwig Scotty, and was perceived as close to Kieren Keke, who joined the Marcus Stephen Administration as Foreign Minister. Pitcher was elected to the Parliament of Nauru in 2004, and served in the second Administration of President Ludwig Scotty.

Finance Minister, 2007

On coming to office, as Minister of Finance, Pitcher inherited the burden of the austerity measures associated with the outgoing Scotty Administration.

In March 2008, the speaker of the Parliament of Nauru, David Adeang, attempted to have Pitcher expelled from Parliament, by summoning a Parliamentary session, allegedly without informing members of the government, which resulted in the passing of a law forbidding Members of Parliament to hold dual citizenship. President Stephen argued that the law was unconstitutional; Adeang said it was not. On 28 March, Adeang ordered Pitcher and another minister, Kieren Keke, to vacate their seats in Parliament, since they both hold dual Nauruan and Australian citizenship. The two ministers refused to do so, and Adeang suspended the sitting.

President of Nauru
On 10 November 2011, incumbent Nauru President Marcus Stephen resigned from the presidency amid corruption allegations. Opposition MPs had accused Stephen of seeking to illegally profit from a phosphate deal. Specifically, opposition leader David Adeang accused Stephen of soliciting potential kickbacks from Thai businesspeople looking to buy phosphates in Nauru. Stephen called the charges "unwarranted and mischievous." He resigned the presidency, but remained in parliament.

Frederick Pitcher, who had previously served as Minister for Commerce, Industry and Environment, became the new President of Nauru on the same day as Stephen's resignation. Pitcher was elected president by the same nine members of parliament who had supported the outgoing Stephen government. Mathew Batsiua, the former health minister, was also named Nauru's new foreign minister, replacing Kieren Keke. Pitcher retained Stephen in his cabinet reshuffle.

Pitcher dismissed corruption allegations against Stephen as baseless upon taking office, telling reporters, "There was no evidence or proof. I think Marcus himself felt that this whole discussion had become a distraction to parliament and to government and he offered to resign. I think he did a noble thing and I applaud him for it. So far allegations [go] I think they were only allegations. I saw nothing to prove they were anything other than false allegations."

Pitcher's presidency was not expected to affect the Australian opposition's plan to open a new immigration centre in Nauru.

Loss of Parliamentary confidence vote

After the defection of one of his supporters Pitcher lost a parliamentary vote of confidence and the presidency on 15 November. Sprent Dabwido was elected as his successor.

Out of Parliament
Former President Pitcher was defeated for re-election to Parliament in elections held in June 2013.

See also
2008 Nauruan parliamentary election
Politics in Nauru

References

Finance Ministers of Nauru
Government ministers of Nauru
Living people
Macquarie University alumni
Members of the Parliament of Nauru
Nauru First politicians
Presidents of Nauru
Australian people of Nauruan descent
1967 births
Environment ministers of Nauru
21st-century Nauruan politicians